Master and Commander: The Far Side of the World is a 2003 adventure film directed by Peter Weir. He and screenwriter John Collee based the film on several novels in the Aubrey–Maturin series written by Patrick O'Brian. Russell Crowe and Paul Bettany starred in the film, alongside a large ensemble cast. A Samuel Goldwyn Films production, Master and Commander had three American distributors, 20th Century Fox, Miramax Films, and Universal Studios. Fox released the adaptation in North America, while Miramax and Universal served as its distributors overseas. It was released in US theaters on 14 November 2003, where it earned $25.7 million on its opening weekend, debuting in second place behind Elf. Since then, Master and Commander reached a US box office total of more than $93.9 million and after its release in foreign countries over the following few months, its worldwide gross ended at around $212 million. The movie was well received by film critics, with an approval rating of 85 percent on review aggregator website Rotten Tomatoes.

Master and Commander garnered various awards and nominations following its release, ranging from recognition of the film itself to its direction, screenwriting, cinematography, and other technical categories. Performances by the cast were also honored, mainly Crowe for Best Actor, Bettany for Best Supporting Actor, and Max Pirkis for Best Young Actor. The adaptation received ten Academy Award nominations but only won in two categories for Best Cinematography and Best Sound Editing; in a ceremony otherwise dominated by The Lord of the Rings: The Return of the King (which won every award it received a nomination for), these were the only two of the ten Master and Commander categories where Return of the King failed to earn a nomination. At the 57th British Academy Film Awards, Master and Commander received eight nominations, ultimately winning in four of them, including the David Lean Award for Achievement in Directing. Weir's direction received a total of eleven nominations, while he and Collee's screenwriting earned four. The overall film received twelve nominations, coming away with accolades at the American Film Institute Awards, London Film Critics Circle Awards, and National Board of Review Awards. The Golden Globes Awards and Broadcast Film Critics Association Awards each saw the movie earn three nominations but leave empty-handed.

Russell Boyd's cinematography was recognized at eight different award ceremonies; in his first Academy Award nomination, he won the Award for Best Cinematography. Iva Davies, Christopher Gordon, and Richard Tognetti's film score won two out of its four nominations. In addition, Master and Commander was included in a number of lists detailing the best films of the year, including The Wall Street Journal, Slate, and Time Magazine, among others. Writing staff at The Daily Telegraph, The Sunday Times, the New York Post, and other media called the film one of the decade's best. Overall, the film won twenty-two awards out of eighty nominations.

Awards and nominations

See also

 2003 in film

References
General

Specific

External links
 

Lists of accolades by film